Philip Nzamba Kitonga (1956 – 24 October 2020) was a Kenyan lawyer and politician.

Career
He held many positions in his career but he was best known for being on the Committee of Experts on Constitutional Review (CoE) that drafted the new Constitution of Kenya. 

He was born in Kitui County, and held positions such as president of the East Africa Law Society and COMESA Court of Justice. 

He was one of the gubernatorial candidates in 2013 Kitui local elections but lost to Julius Malombe. He was one of the shortlisted  candidates for the position of Chief Justice of Kenya to replace Willy Mutunga.

Kitonga while attending a funeral in Mutito, Kitui, collapsed, and died on 24 October 2020 at the age of 64.

References

1956 births
2020 deaths
Kamba people
20th-century Kenyan lawyers
People from Kitui County
Reform in Kenya
21st-century Kenyan lawyers